Yellow.ai, formerly known as Yellow Messenger, is an enterprise conversational AI platform founded in 2016 and headquartered in San Mateo, California. It is an artificial intelligence platform that automates conversational experiences for customers and employees. It enables businesses to deliver human-like personalized interactions in the preferred language. The platform supports more than 135 languages.

History 
Yellow.ai was founded by Raghu Ravinutala, Jaya Kishore Reddy Gollareddy and Rashid Khan in 2016 in Bangalore, India. Raghavendra Ravinutala and Jaya Kishore Reddy Gollareddy had quit their full-time jobs to establish Yellow Messenger, and they met Rashid Khan at a college hackathon, and that's when the latter began working with them. In 2016, the company became a part of Microsoft's accelerator and SAP Startup studio.

In April 2021, during Covid-19, the company built chatbots to help governments with vaccinations. It launched Yellow Messenger Care to create Covid-19 help-related omnichannel chatbots, which helped NGOs and hospitals in their crisis management efforts. In June 2021, the company rebranded itself from Yellow Messenger to Yellow.ai.

Partnership and client base 
In January 2019, the company collaborated with Microsoft to work on transforming its voice automation using Azure Al Speech Services and Natural language processing (NLP) tools. In February 2022, the company partnered with Tech Mahindra to develop enterprise AI technology. It partnered with the e-commerce company Unicommerce in July 2020. In February 2022, Edelweiss General Insurance launched its AI Voice Bot, using Yellow.ai's technology. Yellow.ai implemented its AI-based customer service technology in Urja, a virtual assistant launched by the public sector company BPCL.

Its clients include Schlumberger, MG Motor, Accenture, Flipkart, Grab, Domino's Pizza, Procter & Gamble, Unilever, Axa, American International Group, Bajaj Finance, HDFC Bank, Asian Paints, Adani Capital, Sephora, Renault, Siemens, Bharat Petroleum Corporation Limited, Dr. Reddy's Laboratories, Concentrix and IndiGo.

Funding 
In June 2019, Yellow.ai completed a series A funding of $4 million led by Lightspeed Venture Partners and angel investors such as Phanindra Sama, founder of RedBus, Anand Swaminathan, senior partner, McKinsey & Company, Limeroad founder Prashant Malik, and Snapdeal founder Kunal Bahl.

In April 2020, it raised $20 million in a series B round led by Lightspeed Ventures Partners and Lightspeed India Partners. In August 2021, the company raised $78.15 million in its Series C funding round led by WestBridge Capital, Sapphire Ventures, Salesforce Ventures, and Lightspeed Venture Partners. The company has raised a total of $102 million so far.

Awards 
The company won the Frost & Sullivan Technology Innovation Leadership Award in 2021. Entrepreneur magazine named Yellow.ai the Best AI Startup of the Year at the Entrepreneur India Startup Awards 2022. It was awarded Best Chat/Conversational Bot/Tool during the MarTech Leadership Summit 2022. The Financial Express awarded it the Best Use of Conversational AI – Gold at the Financial Express FuTech Awards in 2022. The company received an honorable mention in the automation solution of the Year category at the CCW Excellence Awards 2022.

Forbes magazine added Yellow.ai's co-founder Rashid Khan to Forbes India 30 Under 30 2022 and Forbes Asia 30 Under 30 2022 lists as one of the young gamechangers disrupting the Enterprise Technology industry. Hurun Research Institute listed the company in its 'Future Unicorn Index 2022' list for India.

See also 

Amazon Alexa
Bixby (virtual assistant)
Cortana (software)
Google Assistant
Apple Siri
Viv (software)

References

Virtual assistants
Internet properties established in 2016
Natural language processing software
2016 establishments in Karnataka
Computer-related introductions in 2016
2016 software
Instant messaging
Indian companies established in 2016
Indian brands